Stacy Jo Scott (born 1981) is an American artist, art educator, curator, and writer based in Eugene, Oregon, who works in ceramics and digital fabrication.

Early life and education
Scott earned a BFA (summa cum laude) in Ceramics from the University of Oregon in 2010, and an MFA in Ceramics at Cranbrook Academy of Art in 2012.

Career 

Scott generates artworks in ceramics and other media with digital production methods. She refers to her creative practice as tracking "the shifting edge between the seen and unseen." She says she creates objects "in the continuum between technology and embodiment, materiality and the virtual, order and chance, language and silence." Scott works both independently and collaboratively as a part of the Craft Mystery Cult Performance collaborative, described as "a group tracing the relationship of object materiality and human interaction".

Art education 
In 2013, Scott was the Franzen Fellow for Digital Craft at Colorado State University-Fort Collins. From 2015-2017, she was a Lecturer in the Department of Art Practice at the University of California-Berkeley. She also has taught at The Golden Dome School For Performing Planetary Rites. Scott joined the faculty of the Art Department of the University of Oregon in 2017.

Curatorial practice 
Speaking about "New Morphologies: Studio Ceramics and Digital Practices" at Schein-Joseph International Museum of Ceramic Art at Alfred University, which she curated with Del Harrow in 2013, Scott said, "What most excites me about digital fabrication are the ways in which it continues to enact our very human striving to bring form to an ideal." The exhibit highlighted "work that emerges from the encounter between the physical materiality of ceramic objects and the ephemerality of digital information".

Selected exhibitions
 Rise Out of the Scattered Deep, Abrams Claghorn Gallery, Albany, CA. (2016)
 Setting The Table, with Iris Eichenberg, Paul Kotula Projects, Ferndale, MI. (2013)
 The Hapticon of the Craft Mystery Cult, Roots & Culture, Contemporary Art Center, Chicago, IL. (2012)

Selected publications

See also
 Digital arts
 3D computer graphics

References

External links
 
 Q & A: Stacy Jo Scott on Digital Technologies
 Ephemeral Material: Digital Fabrication, Embodiment, and the Persistent Materiality of Transcendence. (2017) (video, 37:25)

1981 births
21st-century American sculptors
21st-century American women artists
Living people
University of Oregon faculty
American art curators
American women curators
American ceramists
American women ceramists
University of Oregon alumni
Cranbrook Academy of Art alumni
Artists from Eugene, Oregon
Writers from Eugene, Oregon
Sculptors from Oregon
21st-century ceramists
American women academics